The University of Wisconsin–Stevens Point Pointers (casually known as the UW-Stevens Point Pointers) are the athletic teams of the University of Wisconsin–Stevens Point. The Pointers athletic teams compete in NCAA Division III.

Football

The UW-Stevens Point football team holds the annual Spud Bowl game sponsored by local potato farms and brewery companies as the first home game of the season. The Pointers also hold the annual Pink Game, which benefits the Susan G. Komen Foundation of Central Wisconsin, and the Circle of Friends Foundation, which provides opportunities to kids with cancer. The Pointers play their home games at Goerke Field.

Basketball
The Pointers men's and women's basketball teams have combined for six NCAA Division III titles. The women's basketball team won the national title in 2002, 15 years after its first NCAA Division III title in 1987. The men's basketball team won back-to-back NCAA Division III titles in 2004 and 2005.

Track and field
The UWSP men's track and field teams have won 3 individual NAIA national titles and 16 individual NCAA Division III national titles. The women's teams have combined to win 13 individual NCAA Division III titles. The men's team has had 61 All-American performances at the NCAA Division III Indoor Track & Field Championships since 1985 and over 70 at the NCAA Division III Outdoor Track and Field Championships since 1982. The women have had 24 indoor NCAA Division III All-American performances between 1985 and 2007 and 27 Outdoor All-American performances from 1984 to 2007.

The men's track team coach Rick Witt, who has been head coach for over 30 years, was named National Coach of the Year once, Regional Coach of the Year seven times, and Conference Coach of the Year 14 times.

Notable athletes
Kirk Baumgartner, football player
J. P. Feyereisen, baseball player
Ted Fritsch, football player
Clint Kriewaldt, football player
Scott May, baseball player
Terry Porter, basketball player and coach
Barry Rose, football player
Brad Soderberg, basketball coach
Jordan Zimmermann, baseball player

References